Garfield Township, Minnesota may refer to:
 Garfield Township, Lac qui Parle County, Minnesota
 Garfield Township, Polk County, Minnesota

See also
 Garfield Township (disambiguation)

Minnesota township disambiguation pages